Qipengyuania aquimaris  is a Gram-negative, non-spore-forming, slightly halophilic and non-motile bacteria from the genus Qipengyuania which has been isolated from the Yellow Sea in Korea.

References

Further reading

External links
Type strain of Erythrobacter aquimaris at BacDive -  the Bacterial Diversity Metadatabase

Sphingomonadales
Bacteria described in 2004